Hellinsia triadias is a moth of the family Pterophoridae that is endemic to India.

References

triadias
Moths described in 1908
Plume moths of Asia
Endemic fauna of India